Charles Farwell Edson (April 3, 1864 – August 7, 1936) was an American composer. His work was part of the music event in the art competition at the 1932 Summer Olympics. He was the nephew of prominent Chicago businessman John V. Farwell and Senator Charles B. Farwell, as well as the first cousin of Anna de Koven and Rose Farwell Chatfield-Taylor. He married Katherine Philips Edson, and they had a son, Charles Farwell Edson, Jr.

References

1864 births
1936 deaths
American male composers
Olympic competitors in art competitions
People from San Francisco